The NTT Tower (formerly Dimension Data Tower, 'Vodafone on The Quay' and 'Mobil on The Park') was designed by Peddle Thorp & Montgomery Architects and was completed in 1999. The main architect on the build was Robert Montgomery and the building was built by Mainzeal Construction. The building was engineered by Connell Wagner Structural Engineers, (now Aurecon).

NTT Tower comprises two parts, a modernist high-rise building constructed of concrete with exterior façades of blue glass and the refurbished and strengthened old Police Station buildings that flank the tower.  Carparking takes up the lower tower floors to about the height of the old buildings, with office space above that.

The building stands at 93 metres high and has twenty five stories above the ground, making it the fourth tallest building in Wellington and the twenty fifth tallest building in New Zealand . The construction was valued at $45 million.

The building is owned by Precinct Properties and was renamed to Dimension Data Tower in March 2017. With the global name change of Dimension Data to NTT in 2019, the building's name and branding changed yet again.  The building already houses, or has housed, many of New Zealand's top technology companies such as Microsoft New Zealand, Provoke Solutions, Google NZ, as well as tech start-ups such as SuiteFiles. Midland Park has built up a reputation for being the IT centre of Wellington and is surrounded by many government departments.

Associated Companies 
 Provoke Solutions Limited
 The Group Limited
 SuiteFiles
 Fonterra
 Microsoft NZ
 Parker & Associates
 Swan Legal Limited
 Baldwins Intellectual Property
 SAP New Zealand Limited
 VMware Inc.
 FMG
 Forsyth Barr Leveraged Equities Assignment
 Tourism New Zealand
 Rabobank
 Russell McVeagh

References

Buildings and structures in Wellington City
Skyscrapers in Wellington
1990s architecture in New Zealand
Skyscraper office buildings in New Zealand
Office buildings completed in 1999
1999 establishments in New Zealand